The Robertson Tunnel is a twin-bore light rail tunnel through the Tualatin Mountains west of Portland, Oregon, United States, used by the MAX Blue and Red Lines. Trains are in the tunnel for about 5 minutes, which includes a stop at the Washington Park station. The tunnel has won several worldwide engineering and environmental awards. It was placed into service September 12, 1998.

The tunnels pass through basalt layers up to 16 million years old.  Due to variations in the rock composition, the tunnel curves mildly side to side and up and down to follow the best rock construction conditions.  The tunnels vary from 80 to 300 feet (24–91 m) below the surface.  A core sample taken during construction is on display with a timeline of local geologic history.
The east tunnel entrance is near Vista Bridge at the edge of the Goose Hollow neighborhood at the foot of Washington Park.  The west entrance is along U.S. Highway 26 just west of the Finley-Sunset Hills cemetery, about a mile east of the junction with Oregon Highway 217.

Name 

The tunnel is named for William D. Robertson, who served on the TriMet board of directors and was its president at the time of his death.

History 

Plans to build a light rail line to serve Portland's western suburbs in Washington County emerged in 1979 with a Metro regional government proposal to extend what would become the Metropolitan Area Express (MAX) from its inaugural terminus in downtown Portland farther west to the cities of Beaverton and Hillsboro. During early planning, several alternative alignments through the West Hills were determined, including routes along the Sunset Highway, Beaverton–Hillsdale Highway, and Multnomah Boulevard. A majority of jurisdictions had selected a Sunset Highway light rail alternative by June 1982, with the Portland City Council the last to adopt a resolution supporting this route in July 1983. Metro subsequently moved forward with this alternative, and the Urban Mass Transportation Administration (UMTA) authorized $1.3 million in funds to begin a preliminary engineering study. Soon afterwards, TriMet suspended the project to focus on the completion of the first MAX segment.

Planning for the westside extension resumed in January 1988. Prior to the start of preliminary engineering efforts, the Portland City Council asked TriMet to consider building a rail tunnel through the West Hills instead of following the Sunset Highway alternative's proposal to run tracks on the surface alongside Canyon Road. TriMet's engineers noted that this surface option would carry a steep six- to seven-percent grade as opposed to only two percent in a tunnel. That May, TriMet awarded a $230,000 contract to surveying firm Spencer B. Gross of Portland to map out the proposed area and another $200,000 contract to a partnership between Cornforth Consultants of Tigard and tunneling firm Law/Geoconsult International International of Atlanta to determine alternative tunnel routes. After several months of soil testing, TriMet announced that a tunnel would be feasible. In October, the agency released a report that identified three tunnel options: a  "long tunnel" with a station serving the Oregon Zoo, the same long tunnel without a station, and a  "short tunnel". Both long tunnels featured a western portal west of Sylvan while the short tunnel featured one on Canyon Road, and all three had an eastern portal near Jefferson Street in Portland's Goose Hollow neighborhood. These proposals were immediately met with opposition from West Hills residents who feared that tunneling activity would trigger landslides.

Several alternative alignments through the West Hills were studied, including an all-surface option along the Sunset Highway (U.S. 26), an option with a half-mile-long (0.8km) "short tunnel", and an option with a three-mile (4.8km) "long tunnel". TriMet selected the "long tunnel" in April 1991.

Construction began in the summer of 1993 at the west end, employing the conventional mining technique of drilling and blasting due to the loose mixture of materials.  More than 75 tons of explosives were used and mining progressed about a mile into the hill.  East end construction began in August 1994 with a customized tunnel boring machine.  About a thousand workers from 230 construction firms were involved in the 18-mile westside MAX line, including those who built the tunnel and installed the reinforced concrete liner, tracks and wiring.  One worker was killed while operating equipment.

Tunnel construction continued 24 hours a day, six days per week.  The north tunnelers met after 16 months on December 29, 1995, and the boring machine began the south tunnel in April 1996.  Work in the south tunnel took only four months before the tunneling teams met on August 15, 1996.

To complete the west end at the cemetery, 14 bodies were relocated.

The original estimate for the tunnel was $103.7 million, but the final price tag came to $184 million, largely due to challenges posed by unexpected loose layers of silt and gravel, and crumbling basalt which prevented the boring machine from working effectively.

Route 

The tunnel generally follows – but remains north of – U.S. Highway 26, diverging the most in the Oregon Zoo area.

The elevation at the west end is higher than the east but there is very little perceptible slope except for several gentle, short grades which exist presumably to follow the easiest-to-bore rock stratum.

During construction, the east portal was west of Canyon Road, below City of Portland Reservoir 4. After completion, the road was raised and an overpass placed over the track.

Beginning at the east end (traveling westward), under Canyon Road the tunnel turns SSW (202°) for about  where it turns WSW (236°) under the large field east of the Elephant House.

For the remaining ), it turns right in a long gradual arc exactly paralleling Sunset Hwy. The arc continues at the same rate after the west portals, and is due west (270°) about  past the portals.

See also 
 List of tunnels in the United States
 List of tunnels by location

References

External links
Portland's Westside light rail tunnel

Transportation buildings and structures in Portland, Oregon
Railroad tunnels in Oregon
MAX Blue Line
MAX Red Line
Tunnels completed in 1998
1998 establishments in Oregon
Southwest Portland, Oregon